Hasanabad (also Romanized as Ḩasanābād; also known as Ḩasanābād-e Zobeyrī, Zībīrī, Zībrī, Zībrī Hasan Abad, Zobeyrī, and Zobeyrī Ḩasanābād) is a village in Hasanabad Rural District, in the Central District of Eslamabad-e Gharb County, Kermanshah Province, Iran. At the 2006 census, its population was 1,145, in 270 families. The village is populated by Kurds.

References 

Populated places in Eslamabad-e Gharb County
Kurdish settlements in Kermanshah Province